Randal Gaines is an American politician from the state of Louisiana. He serves in the Louisiana House of Representatives and is a member of the Democratic Party.

Gaines is an attorney from LaPlace, Louisiana. He served in the United States Army for three years and in the Louisiana National Guard for 25 years, including in Operation Desert Storm and Hurricane Katrina. He became a lieutenant colonel. He has also worked as a tax attorney for the Internal Revenue Service, an assistant city attorney for the New Orleans, and an associate professor and director of the Criminal Justice Department at Southern University. Governor Bobby Jindal appointed Gaines to Southern University's board of supervisors in 2009.

In 2007, Gaines ran for the 57th district seat in the Louisiana House, but lost the election to Nickie Monica. He ran again and was elected to the Louisiana House in 2011. He was unopposed for reelection in 2015 and 2019, when his only challenger was disqualified from running.

References

External links

Living people
Year of birth missing (living people)
People from LaPlace, Louisiana
Louisiana lawyers
National Guard (United States) officers
Louisiana National Guard personnel
Southern University faculty
Democratic Party members of the Louisiana House of Representatives
21st-century American politicians